The Ohel Leah Synagogue (Hebrew: בית הכנסת  אהל לאה  Beit Ha-Knesset Ohel Leah) and its next-door neighbors, the Jewish Recreation Club and the Jewish Community Center, have formed the center of Jewish social and religious life in Hong Kong for over a century.  Originally the community was mostly Baghdadi and the synagogue was under the superintendence of the Haham of the Spanish and Portuguese Congregation of London: it is now fully independent and has members from across the Jewish diaspora.

Most of Hong Kong's Jews live only a short distance away from the Synagogue, which sits at the junction of Robinson Road and Castle Road.  An example of Colonial Sephardic architecture, the two-storied, whitewashed, multi-turreted Synagogue nestles amid the soaring high-rises of steel and glass perched on the Mid-Levels of Hong Kong Island. The Synagogue was designed by the architects Leigh & Orange and was erected in 1901–1902. It underwent a US$6 million restoration in 1998 which returned its interiors and exteriors to their original state.

The name Ohel Leah commemorates Leah Sassoon, the mother of the Sassoon brothers Jacob, Edward, and Meyer who donated the land for building the Synagogue.  The Sassoons were among the earliest Sephardic merchants from India to settle in Hong Kong during the mid to late 19th century.

Ohel Leah is a Modern Orthodox congregation and received its first officially appointed rabbi in 1961. Three other Jewish congregations have also emerged more recently in Hong Kong: the Sephardic, which is dominated by Israeli expatriates; the Chabad Lubavitch; and the United Jewish Congregation, which is aligned with the more liberal Reform and Conservative movements.  Many worshippers, however, hold concurrent memberships in several congregations.

Conservation
The historic Synagogue was first listed as a Grade I historic building in July 1987. By December 1987, the listing was voluntarily removed as there was talk of demolishing the building. In order to provide the building with immediate protection against demolition, the Antiquities Authority of the Hong Kong Government declared it a proposed monument. Ohel Leah Synagogue was consequently saved based on a preservation arrangement agreed between Government and the owner. It has been again a Grade I historic building since 1990. Its renovation in 1998 obtained the Outstanding Project Award of the 2000 UNESCO Asia Pacific Heritage Awards for Culture Heritage Conservation.

See also
Ohel Rachel Synagogue, built by the Sassoon family in Shanghai

References

Leah Krakinowski, Can $150 Million Preserve Hong Kong's Jews, Moment, August 1997, pp. 52–7, 91.

External links

Ohel Leah Synagogue

1902 establishments in China
Grade I historic buildings in Hong Kong
Mid-Levels
Modern Orthodox synagogues
Sephardi Jewish culture in Asia
Synagogues in China
Religious buildings and structures in Hong Kong
Jews and Judaism in Hong Kong
Iraqi-Jewish diaspora in Asia